Gnephoek is a polder and a hamlet in the Dutch province of South Holland. It is a part of the municipality of Alphen aan den Rijn, and lies about 2 km west of Alphen aan den Rijn.

The statistical area "Gnephoek", which also can include the surrounding countryside, has a population of around 250.

References

Populated places in South Holland
Alphen aan den Rijn